Sunshine Minting, Inc., is a privately held company based in Coeur d'Alene, Idaho, that processes silver, gold and other precious metals. It is known as a supplier of silver planchets to the United States Mint and as the manufacturer of the private Liberty Dollar coins.

Sunshine Minting provides custom minting services and has an on-site storage vault program for customers who own at least 10 ounces of gold or 500 ounces of silver.

References

Companies based in Idaho